Dietrich von Kittlitz otherwise Dietrich II of Meissen or Dietrich II von Kittlitz (died 29 August 1208) was Bishop of Meissen from 1191 to 1208.

He was a member of the noble family of Kittlitz. During his episcopate the Priory of St. Afra in Meissen was founded, in 1205.

Bibliography 
 Eduard Machatschek: Geschichte der Bischöfe des Hochstiftes Meissen in chronologischer Reihenfolge (...), pp. 136–145. Dresden 1884

External links 
 Marek Wejwoda: Dietrich II. (von Kittlitz) in Institut für Sächsische Geschichte und Volkskunde (ed.): Sächsische Biografie 

Roman Catholic bishops of Meissen
Year of birth unknown
1208 deaths